The following is a list of political parties in Monaco. Traditionally Monaco is a one party dominant state with the National and Democratic Union (now, Rally & Issues) in power. Opposition parties were widely considered nonexistent. However, following the 2003 parliamentary election, the Union for Monaco (now Union Monegasque), a coalition of two parties, won 21 of the 24 seats in the National Council. Following the 2013 parliamentary election, however, Horizon Monaco, a coalition of, Rally & Issues, Synergie Monegasque and Union for the Principality, held the majority of parliamentary seats. Since 2016 a majority of the former ruling coalition have defected from the Horizon Monaco coalition and formed the New Majority coalition in partnership with Renaissance and this coalition now controls the National Council under the leadership of Christophe Steiner.

List of parties

Coalitions

New Majority
Synergie Monegasque (Synergie Monégasques)

Horizon Monaco
Synergie Monegasque (Synergie Monégasques)

Union Monégasque
Union of Monaco (Union pour Monaco)

Monegasque National Union
Priorité Monaco (Priority Monaco)
Union Monégasque

Minor
Party Monegasque (Parti Monégasque)

Defunct
Democratic Union Movement (Mouvement d'union démocratique)
Rally & Issues (Rassemblement & Enjeux)
Union for the Principality (Union pour la Principauté)
Renaissance
National Union for the Future of Monaco (Union nationale pour l'Avenir de Monaco)
Rally for the Monegasque Family (Rassemblement pour la Famille Monégasque)

Monaco
Politics of Monaco
 
Monaco
Lists of organisations based in Monaco
Parties